Saulo Benavente (February 11, 1916 – June 26, 1982) was an Argentine painter.

1916 births
1982 deaths
20th-century Argentine painters
20th-century Argentine male artists
Argentine male painters